Eleanor "Elly" Humes Haney (December 30, 1931 – July 10, 1999) was an American feminist theologian and community activist.

Personal
Haney was born in Milford, Delaware, on December 30, 1931. She died on July 10, 1999, in Phippsburg, Maine.

Education
Haney attended The College of William & Mary, where she received a B.A. in English. She attended Wellesley College, where she received an M.A. in English. She obtained a master's degree in Religious Education (MRE) from the Presbyterian School of Christian Education.
She then went to Yale University where she obtained a Ph.D. in Christian Ethics.

Career
Haney held a number of teaching positions at different schools in the New England area: Virginia Union, Concordia College, the University of New England, Westbrook College, MECA (at the time, Portland School of Art), Bangor Theological Seminary and the University of Southern Maine.

Publications
She wrote six books on feminist theology, ecological ethics, economic justice, anti-racism and alliance-building, the most important being A Feminist Legacy:  The Ethics of Wilma Scott Heide and Company (1985). Heide was the third national President of the National Organization for Women (NOW).

Haney also wrote The Great Commandment:  A Theology of Resistance and Transformation (Pilgrim Press, 1998).

Awards and recognition
Haney was a member of Phi Beta Kappa Society.

She received the Hartman Award from the University of Maine in 1998.

The Bangor Daily News described her as a "theology pioneer" and said she had "a major impact on Maine."

Legacy
The Eleanor Humes Haney Fund (or foundation) is a charitable foundation funded by a grant from Haney. The aims of the fund is to give grants to charitable organisations in the New England Area that strive to:

■ Improve collaboration across a range of groups and constituencies to address major oppressions such as racism, sexism, classism and/or anthropocentrism.

■ Build alliances to challenge more effectively the status quo at any or all levels: local, state, national, and/or international.

■ Create effective ways to achieve social and economic justice.

■ Involve ethical principles that can be transferred to other contexts.

The fund has supported initiatives like :

■ Add Verb Productions (a non-profit organization headquartered in Portland, Mainly that provides health and wellness education through provocative theatre performances)

■ Organizations focussing on LGBT issues like: Charlie Howard Remembered

■ Organizations encouraging civic activism and sponsoring documentaries like "There ought to be a Law"

References

External links
Eleanor Humes Haney Fund website

1931 births
1999 deaths
American theologians
American feminists
People from Milford, Delaware
People from Sagadahoc County, Maine
Wellesley College alumni
University of Southern Maine faculty
University of New England (United States) faculty
Westbrook College faculty